The South African Railways Class 5E, Series 1 of 1955 was an electric locomotive.

In 1955 and 1956, the South African Railways placed sixty Class 5E,  electric locomotives with a Bo-Bo wheel arrangement in mainline service. The Class 5E introduced what eventually became the most prolific locomotive body shape to ever run on South African rails.

Manufacturers
To cope with increased traffic loads on the South African Railways (SAR) in the 1950s, the capacity of its 3 kV DC electrified lines had to be increased. Since more sections in Natal and Transvaal were being electrified, the SAR placed an order for the design and production of a new and more powerful Bo-Bo mainline electric locomotive with English Electric (EE) in 1952. Sixty Class 5E, Series 1 locomotives were delivered and placed in service in 1955 and 1956, numbered in the range from E259 to E318.

The first 48 units, numbered in the range from E259 to E306, were built at the Dick Kerr works of EE in Preston in 1954 and 1955, while the construction of the last twelve, numbered in the range from E307 to E318, was subcontracted to Vulcan Foundry. These twelve, with EE works numbers in the range from 2211 to 2222, were therefore also allocated Vulcan works numbers in the range from E137 to E148.

They were delivered in a bottle green livery with red cowcatchers, initially without the yellow lines and whiskers which were added later to improve their visibility. Beginning in 1960, a Gulf Red and yellow whiskers livery gradually replaced the green and yellow.

With both the bottle green and later the Gulf Red SAR liveries, the units had red cowcatchers, except in the Cape Western region. Locomotives based at the Bellville Depot could be identified by their yellow cowcatchers.

Orientation
These dual cab locomotives had a roof access ladder on one side only, just to the right of the cab access door. The roof access ladder end was marked as the no. 2 end. A corridor along the centre of the locomotive connected the cabs, which were identical except that cab 2 was where the handbrake was located.

Brakes
While the locomotive itself used air brakes, it was only equipped to operate trains with vacuum brakes. While working a train downgrade, the locomotive's regenerative braking system would also work in conjunction with the train's vacuum brakes.

The locomotive's air brakes would usually only be used along with the train brakes during emergencies. Under normal circumstances the train would be controlled by using the train brakes alone to slow down and stop.

While the locomotive was stopped, the air brakes on each bogie could be applied independently. The handbrake or parking brake, located in cab 2, only operated on the unit's last axle, the no. 7 and 8 wheels.

Class 5E series

The Class 5E was produced in three series, the EE- and Vulcan-built Series 1 and the Vulcan-built Series 2 and Series 3. Between 1955 and 1959, altogether 160 Class 5E locomotives were placed in service, 60 Series 1, 45 Series 2 and 55 Series 3.

The traditional number plates on the sides of SAR locomotives were usually in a perfect oval shape and were usually cast in a leaded bronze. On the Class 5E, Series 1, however, the plates were in an oval shape with blunted ends and were cast in aluminium.

Legacy
The Class 5E introduced what eventually became the most prolific locomotive body shape to ever run on South African rails, serving on all the 3 kV DC lines country-wide. The body shape and dimensions were continued with the Class 5E1 in 1959, the Class 6E and the Class 6E1 from 1969 to 1985, and still later with the rebuilding of Class 6E1 locomotives to Class 18E, a project which began in 2000.

Service
The Class 5E entered service on the Natal mainline between Durban and Johannesburg and eventually served almost country-wide as electrification was completed on more mainlines. In 1960, sixty units of the Class 5E family were allocated to the Witbank section upon completion of its electrification. In December 1961 twelve of them were replaced by Class 32-000 diesel-electric locomotives and transferred to the newly-electrified Touws River-Beaufort West section. More followed to replace the Class 25 condensers that were being transferred from that section to Beaconsfield in Kimberley. At the time, electric locomotives were urgently needed on the Touwsrivier–Beaufort West section, most likely because of the water issues in the Karoo and the redeployment of the Class 25 condensing steam locomotives to the Northern Cape.

After withdrawal from service, six Class 5E, Series 1 locomotives were sold into industrial service.
 Five, numbers E269, E274, E284, E289 and E318, were sold to the Impala platinum mine in Rustenburg.
 No. E290 was sold to the Driefontein gold mine near Carletonville.

Preservation
Currently only two have been preserved so far in preservation of the Class 5E Series 1 variants.

Class 5E E259 the class leader is preserved at Bloemfontein Loco Depot with intentions for it to be a museum as this loco is the first sub-leader of the Class 5E Series 1's and is marked as a historic locomotive.
Class 5E E293 Incorrectly numbered E262 is preserved at Bellville Loco Depot.

Works numbers
The EE and Vulcan works numbers of the Class 5E, Series 1 and their known disposal are shown in the table.

Illustration

References

2780
Bo-Bo locomotives
English Electric locomotives
Vulcan Foundry locomotives
Cape gauge railway locomotives
Railway locomotives introduced in 1955
1955 in South Africa